Don Summers is an American former tight end in the National Football League.

Biography
Summers was born on February 22, 1961, in Grants Pass, Oregon, United States.

Career
Summers played two seasons with the Denver Broncos, before playing with the Green Bay Packers during the 1987 NFL season. He played at the collegiate level at Boise State University and the Oregon Institute of Technology.

See also
List of Green Bay Packers players

References

Sportspeople from Grants Pass, Oregon
Denver Broncos players
Green Bay Packers players
American football tight ends
Boise State University alumni
Oregon Tech Hustlin' Owls football players
Boise State Broncos football players
Living people
1961 births
Players of American football from Oregon